Governador Island (Ilha do Governador, in Portuguese; literally Governor's Island, in English) is the largest island in Guanabara Bay, in Rio de Janeiro, Brazil.

Rio de Janeiro's main airport, Galeão - Antônio Carlos Jobim International Airport, and the Galeão Air Force Base are located on Governador Island and occupy about a third of it, in the western and northwestern parts. A small sea inlet that once existed on the northwestern shore was landfilled to build the airport's runway 10/28, thereby increasing the island's area.

Often mentioned by cariocas (inhabitants of Rio city) simply as Ilha ("island"), Governador Island has some favelas, such as Morro do Dendê, the largest one, but it also has many middle-class neighborhoods like the third best IDH index in the city, Jardim Guanabara. The island is connected to Fundão Island and to the mainland by a complex of expressway bridges and through a ferry in Cocotá Terminal, transporting passengers to downtown Rio.

The name means "Governor's Island" because one of the first colonial governors of Brazil built a country house on the island in the 16th century. The native name for the island in Old Tupi was Paranapuã, which means "sea branch".

People from Governador Island suffer from high pollution from Guanabara Bay. Although surrounded by beaches, many of them have become unusable even though the bay has been cleaned up in recent years for the 2016 Summer Olympics.

The island is home to only one professional football club, A.A. Portuguesa. Its home is Estádio Luso Brasileiro, which in recent years has been expanded so it can be used professionally by Botafogo, as Estádio Olímpico João Havelange, its normal home, is being used for Olympic purposes. It was also used by Flamengo during 2017 and 2018, in the time being called Ilha do Urubu.

Neighborhoods
In July 1981, the then mayor Júlio Coutinho approved a law that effectively divided Governador Island in fourteen different new neighborhoods: Bancários, Cacuia, Cocotá, Galeão, Jardim Carioca, Jardim Guanabara, Moneró, Pitangueiras, Portuguesa, Praia da Bandeira, Ribeira, Tauá and Zumbi.

References

External links

Atlantic islands of Brazil
Guanabara Bay
Geography of Rio de Janeiro (city)
Landforms of Rio de Janeiro (state)